The 2015 Gamba Osaka season was Gamba Osaka's 22nd season in the J.League Division 1 and 28th overall in the Japanese top flight. It also includes the 2015 J.League Cup, 2015 Emperor's Cup, 2015 AFC Champions League, 2015 Japanese Super Cup and the 2015 Suruga Bank Championship.

Transfers

In

Out

First team squad

Pre-season friendlies

Japanese Super Cup

Gamba started their domestic season on 28 February 2015 with a 2-0 victory over the 2014 J.League runners-up, the Urawa Red Diamonds in Yokohama. Both Gamba's goals came in the second half and were scored by Takashi Usami and Patric.

J.League 1

Starting from the 2015 season, it was announced that the J.League would again change back to a two-stage "mini-league" (last held in 2004). The winners of each stage and top three clubs of the aggregate table subsequently qualify for the Championship.

First stage

Match day line-ups

The following players appeared for Gamba Osaka during the 2015 J.League 1 First Stage:

  = Substitute on,  = Substitute Off,  = Number of goals scored,  = Yellow Card and  = Red Card.

Second stage

Match day line-ups
The following players appeared for Gamba Osaka during the 2015 J.League 1 Second stage:

  = Substitute on,  = Substitute Off,  = Number of goals scored,  = Yellow Card and  = Red Card.

Overall standings

Championship stage

Gamba's 3rd-place finish in the overall standings for J.League 1 in 2015 saw them paired against the Urawa Red Diamonds at the semi-final stage.   Due to Urawa's higher placing, the match was played at Saitama Stadium 2002, Urawa's home ground.   A 3-1 win after extra-time set up a two-legged final against Sanfrecce Hiroshima.

Match day line-ups

The following players appeared for Gamba Osaka during the J.League 1 Championship Stage:

  = Substitute on,  = Substitute Off,  = Number of goals scored,  = Yellow Card and  = Red Card.

AFC Champions League

As 2014 J.League Division 1 champions, Gamba qualified for the 2015 AFC Champions League. This was their 7th appearance in the competition and their first since 2012. They were drawn into Group F along with Buriram United of Thailand, Guangzhou R&F of China and Seongnam of South Korea.   Gamba finished top of the group and along with Seongnam qualified for the Round of 16. As Group F winners they were paired against the runner-up of Group H who were FC Seoul. Gamba defeated Seoul 6-3 on aggregate and were paired with yet another Korean side, Jeonbuk Hyundai Motors in the quarter finals.   Following a scoreless draw in the first leg in Korea, Gamba sealed a dramatic 3-2 victory at home, with defender Koki Yonekura netting the winner in the 93rd minute to ensure their progression to the semi-finals where they were paired with Chinese side Guangzhou Evergrande.   A 2-1 defeat in China followed by 0-0 draw at home saw Gamba fall at the semi-final stage.

Match day line-ups

The following players appeared for Gamba Osaka during the 2015 AFC Champions League:

  = Substitute on,  = Substitute Off,  = Number of goals scored,  = Yellow Card and  = Red Card.

Suruga Bank Championship

The Suruga Bank Championship sees the winners of the previous season's J.League Cup and Copa Sudamerica face off in a one-off match.   This saw Gamba take on Argentine giants River Plate.   A 3-0 defeat at Osaka Expo '70 Stadium saw Gamba finish as runners-up.

J.League Cup

As a result of their qualification for the AFC Champions League, Gamba were given a bye into the quarter-finals of the League Cup, where they were paired against Nagoya Grampus in a two-legged encounter.   After a dramatic 10-9 penalty shoot-out victory over Nagoya, in which goalkeeper Yosuke Fujigaya struck the winning penalty, Gamba were drawn against Albirex Niigata in the semi-finals.   A 3-2 aggregate win over Niigata set up a final against Kashima Antlers which they lost 3-0.

Match day line-ups

The following players appeared for Gamba Osaka during the 2015 J.League Cup:

  = Substitute on,  = Substitute Off,  = Number of goals scored,  = Yellow Card and  = Red Card.

Emperor's Cup

Due to their success in reaching the AFC Champions League semi-final, Gamba were given a bye to the 4th round of the Emperor's Cup where they were drawn away to fellow J-League 1 side Kawasaki Frontale.  A 2-0 victory saw them progress to the quarter-finals where they were paired with another J-League 1 outfit, this time Sagan Tosu.   A 3-1 win ensured they qualified for the semi-finals where they were again successful, this time beating 2015 J-League 1 Champions Sanfrecce Hiroshima 3-0 in a match played at Nagai Stadium.   The final was played at Ajinomoto Stadium, Tokyo on 1 January 2016 and saw Gamba triumph 2-1 against the Urawa Red Diamonds to retain the trophy.

Match day line-ups

The following players appeared for Gamba Osaka during the 2015 Emperor's Cup:

  = Substitute on,  = Substitute Off,  = Number of goals scored,  = Yellow Card and  = Red Card.

Squad statistics

Statistics accurate as of match played 1 January 2016.

1 Includes 2015 J1 League Championship, 2015 Japanese Super Cup and 2015 Suruga Bank Championship appearances.

References

Gamba Osaka
Gamba Osaka seasons